Lamprosema hebitare is a moth in the Crambidae family. It was described by Whalley in 1962. It is found on the Solomon Islands.

References

Moths described in 1962
Lamprosema
Moths of Oceania